This is a list of seasons completed by the UTSA Roadrunners college football program, the Roadrunners represent The University of Texas at San Antonio (UTSA) in the American Athletic Conference. UTSA plays its home games at the Alamodome in San Antonio, Texas.

Seasons

References

UTSA Roadrunners

UTSA Roadrunners football seasons
UTSA Roadrunners football seasons